The Rhone, formerly known as Gilroy, was a 1,768 ton, iron sailing ship with a length of 259.2 feet, breadth of 39.9 feet and depth of 23.2 feet.

History 
{| class="wikitable" style="float:right; clear: right"
|+ Details of some of the Rhones voyages
! Destination      !! Date of arrival  !! Number of passengers !! Deaths during voyage
|-
| Fiji         || 15 May 1890      || 585                  || n/a
|-
| Trinidad     || 9 October 1891   || 677                  || 16
|-
| Trinidad         || 23 October 1892  || 666                  || 4
|-
| Trinidad         || 28 October 1893  || 653                  || 4
|-
| Trinidad         || 4 October 1894   || 662                  || 8
|-
| Trinidad         || 16 October 1895  || 690                  || 109
|-
| Fiji             || 11 May 1897      || 653                  || n/a
|-
| Trinidad          || 10 November 1898 || 652                  || 3
|-
| Suriname     || 10 January 1903  || n/a                  || n/a
|-
| Suriname         || 8 November 1905  || n/a                  || n/a
|}

The Rhone was built by John Elder of Glasgow, Scotland in 1875 for Gilroy, Sons & Company of Dundee. The Nourse Line bought the ship in 1889 and renamed it the Rhone after the River Rhone. She was primarily used by the Nourse Line for the transportation of Indian indentured labourers to the colonies.

She was also used to  repatriate 132 former labourers from St Lucia back to India.

The Rhone''' was regarded as a fast ship. She made the run from Trinidad to Cape Town in 45 days and on 4 November 1894 travelled to Gravesend from Trinidad in just 24 days.

Her last voyage was eventful, for her captain died while carrying rice from Calcutta to British Guiana.  On reaching her destination, she got stuck in the mud and some rice had to be thrown overboard before she could be re-floated. After unloading the remainder of the rice, she sailed for Philadelphia but found five stowaways on board. The captain only managed to disembark the stowaways in the United States after signing a bond and paying for their passage to the West Indies.  In Philadelphia she loaded case oil, but the river was frozen  and an icebreaker was used to clear a passage and tugs got her to sea. Her troubles were not over as she experienced minor flooding due to a burst pipe and pumps had to be used for 48 hours to clear the water. At the end of this voyage, in 1905, she was sold to Norway and renamed Dybvaag''.

See also 

 Indian indenture ships to Fiji
 Indians in Fiji
 Indian indenture system

References

External links 
Indian Immigrant Ship List
Genealogy.com         
The Ships List

Indian indentureship in Trinidad and Tobago
Indian indenture ships to Fiji
Individual sailing vessels
Victorian-era passenger ships of the United Kingdom
Merchant ships of Norway
1875 ships
Ships built on the River Clyde